USS LST-574 was a  in the United States Navy during World War II. She was transferred to the Republic of China Navy as ROCS Chung Yung (LST-210).

Construction and career 
LST-574 was laid down on 16 April 1944 at Missouri Valley Bridge and Iron Company, Evansville, Indiana. Launched on 5 June 1944 and commissioned on 26 June 1944.

Service in United States Navy 

During World War II, LST-574 was assigned to the Asiatic-Pacific theater. She then participated in the Leyte landings from 5 to 18 November 1944. In 1945, she took part in the Lingayen Gulf landings from 4 to 18 January and Mindanao Island landing from 10 to 11 March. She was assigned to occupation and China from 2 September 1945 to 25 May 1946.

She was decommissioned on 17 June 1946 and struck from the Naval Register on 3 July 1946 after she was sold to Philippine for commercial service on 5 November 1947. She was then sold to the Republic of China and renamed Chung Yung (LST-210).

Service in Republic of China Navy 
Chung Yung participated in the Battle of Guningtou in October 1949, where she used her significant firepower (2x2 40mm guns, 6x1 40mm guns, 8x1 20mm guns) to destroy beached PLA landing craft. The ship was scheduled to leave a day before the battle after offloading its cargo, but remained, offering an official excuse of "bad weather". The unmentioned real reason the ship remained in the area was that it was running a side business of smuggling brown sugar from Taiwan island in exchange for peanut oil. However, there was not enough peanut oil on the whole island for the deal, so the ship was forced to stay for another day while waiting for more peanut oil to be produced, making it the accidental hero of the battle.

She later became the Jiang Yun of the General Relief and Rehabilitation Administration.

Chung Yung was decommissioned on 16 October 1997 and sunk as an artificial reef on 10 November 2002 off Pingtung County.

Diving observations by Wu Musheng and others on September 18 and December 3, 2003 found that the ship was completely seated on the seabed, there were cement block reefs on the bow and stern, and the electric pole reefs in the cabin were also intact and undamaged. No discarded fishing nets were found in the sand burial phenomenon; the attached organisms observed include sponges, barnacles, hydras, and sea squirts; fish include monosaccharus, red carp, stand sea bream, snapper, snapper, golden sea bass, and lion Fish, mullet, mullet, cold bream, butterfly fish, mackerel, etc.

There are many medium and large benthic fishes gathered in the reef area, and migratory fish schools are also found. The fish gathering effect is very good. The local fishermen formed their own "Warship Reef Area Protection Patrol Team" to actively protect the integrity of the reef area and ban illegal fishing practices. The results have been good and they are also supported by local fishermen.

Awards 
LST-574 have earned the following awards:

China Service Medal (extended) 
American Campaign Medal 
Asiatic-Pacific Campaign Medal (3 battle stars)
World War II Victory Medal
Navy Occupation Service Medal (with Asia clasp) 
Philippines Presidential Unit Citation 
Philippines Liberation Medal (2 battle stars)

Citations

Sources 
 
 
 
 

LST-542-class tank landing ships
Ships built in Evansville, Indiana
World War II amphibious warfare vessels of the United States
LST-542-class tank landing ships of the Republic of China Navy
1944 ships